Edson Isaías Freitas da Silva (born 25 March 1982) is a Brazilian canoeist who won a gold, a silver and a bronze medal in different events at the Pan American Games in 2007 and 2015. He competed in the K-1 200 metres and K-2 200 metres events at the 2016 Summer Olympics, but failed to reach the finals.

References

External links
 

1982 births
Living people
Brazilian male canoeists
Olympic canoeists of Brazil
Canoeists at the 2016 Summer Olympics
Place of birth missing (living people)
Pan American Games medalists in canoeing
Pan American Games gold medalists for Brazil
Pan American Games silver medalists for Brazil
Pan American Games bronze medalists for Brazil
South American Games gold medalists for Brazil
South American Games silver medalists for Brazil
South American Games medalists in canoeing
Canoeists at the 2007 Pan American Games
Canoeists at the 2015 Pan American Games
Competitors at the 2010 South American Games
Medalists at the 2015 Pan American Games
Sportspeople from Porto Alegre
21st-century Brazilian people